HMS Forth, pennant number F04 later A187, was a submarine depot ship.

Forth was completed in 1939. She served at bases in Scotland including Holy Loch on the Clyde and at Halifax in Canada during the Second World War.

During the war Forth was adopted by Stirlingshire as part of Warship Week. The plaque from this adoption is held by the National Museum of the Royal Navy in Portsmouth.

During her stay in Malta in the 1950s she was moored on the east side of Msida creek. In 1953 she took part in the Fleet Review to celebrate the Coronation of Queen Elizabeth II. She left Malta in 1960.

She was modified to support the Royal Navy's nuclear-powered submarines at H.M.Dockyard Chatham between 1962 and 1966.

She arrived in Singapore in mid-1966 to relieve HMS Medway (former landing craft tank HMS LCT 1109) as depot ship of the 7th Submarine Squadron. She left Singapore to return to the United Kingdom on 31 March 1971.

In 1968, HMS Forth transported the first hovercraft (a small two or three seater) to Australia.

References

External links
 
 Depot Ships of the Royal Navy

Auxiliary ships of the Royal Navy
Cold War fleet auxiliaries of the United Kingdom
Ships built on the River Clyde
1938 ships
Royal Navy Submarine Depot Ships